
Gmina Celestynów is a rural gmina (administrative district) in Otwock County, Masovian Voivodeship, in east-central Poland.

The gmina contains part of the protected area called Masovian Landscape Park.

Villages
Gmina Celestynów contains the villages and settlements of Celestynów, Dąbrówka, Dyzin, Glina, Jatne, Lasek, Ostrów, Ostrowik, Podbiel, Pogorzel, Ponurzyca, Regut, Stara Wieś, Tabor and Zabieżki.

Neighbouring gminas
Gmina Celestynów is bordered by the town of Otwock and by the gminas of Karczew, Kołbiel, Osieck, Sobienie-Jeziory and Wiązowna.

References
Polish official population figures 2006

Celestynow
Otwock County